Robert Manuel (7 September 1916 – 8 December 1995) was a 20th-century French stage, television, and film actor, and film director.

Filmography 

1935: La Petite Sauvage (by Jean de Limur)
1937: Salonique, nid d'espions (by Georg Wilhelm Pabst) - un invité au consulat
1938: Orage (by Marc Allégret) - Gilbert
1938: La Marseillaise (by Jean Renoir)
1938: Le Drame de Shanghaï (by Georg Wilhelm Pabst) - Le client attaqué
1939: Jeunes filles en détresse (by Georg Wilhelm Pabst) - Robert (uncredited)
1946: The Captain (by Robert Vernay) - Le comte Hercule de Nesle
1946: Comédie avant Molière (by Jean Tedesco) (Short)
1950: The Paris Waltz (by Marcel Achard) - José Dupuis
1955: Le Fils de Caroline chérie (by Jean Devaivre) - Le Roi Joseph
1955: Napoléon (by Sacha Guitry) - Joseph Bonaparte (uncredited)
1955: Rififi (Du rififi chez les hommes) (by Jules Dassin) - Mario Ferrati
1955: Milord l'Arsouille (by André Haguet) - Marcouski
1955: Si Paris nous était conté (by Sacha Guitry) - Gustave Flaubert
1956: Voici le temps des assassins (by Julien Duvivier) - Mario Bonnacorsi
1956:  It Happened in Aden (by Michel Boisrond) - Zafarana
1957: Comme un cheveu sur la soupe (by Maurice Regamey) - Tony
1958: Police judiciaire (by Maurice de Canonge) - Le commissaire Dupuis
1958: Le désordre et la nuit (by Gilles Grangier) - Blasco
1958: Le Gorille vous salue bien (by Bernard Borderie) - Casa
1958: Life Together (by Clément Duhour) - Georges
1958: Le Bourgeois gentilhomme (by Jean Meyer) - Le maître de musique
1959: Croquemitoufle (by Claude Barma) - Thomas Desjardins
1960: Certains l'aiment froide (by Jean Bastia) - Luigi Valmorin, dit 'Valmorino'
1960: Recours en grâce (by Laslo Benedek) - Le forain
1960: La Dragée haute (by Jean Kerchner)
1960: Candide ou l'optimisme au XXe siècle (by Norbert Carbonnaux) - Tous les officiers allemands / German Officer
1961: Un clair de lune à Maubeuge (by Jean Cherasse) - Charlie Bank, le directeur de Superdisco
1961: 21 rue Blanche à Paris (by Quincy Albicoco et Claude-Yvon Leduc) (documentaire)
1963: Une blonde comme ça (by Jean Jabely) - Commissaire Clancy
1963:  (Die Dreigroschenoper) (by Wolfgang Staudte) - First Hangman
1963: Les Femmes d'abord (by Raoul André) - L'inspecteur principal Viou
1963: Vous souvenez-vous de Paco ? (Rififi en la ciudad) (by Jesus Franco) - Puig
1964: La Tulipe noire (by Christian Jaque) - Prince Alexandre de Grasillach de Morvan Lobo
1964: Une souris chez les hommes (by Jacques Poitrenaud) - Léon Dufour
1964: Les Siffleurs – (Viheltäjät) (by Eino Ruutsalo) - Robert Manuel
1965: Cent briques et des tuiles (by Pierre Grimblat) - Palmoni
1965: Coplan FX 18 (by Riccardo Freda) - Hartung
1967: L'homme qui trahit la mafia (by Charles Gérard) - Le chef de brigade des stupéfiants
1969: Les Gros Malins (by Raymond Leboursier) - Le ministre
1974: La Fille d'Amérique – (The crazy American girl) (by David Newton) - Gigi
1978: Judith Therpauve (by Patrice Chéreau) - Droz
1982: Le Bourgeois gentilhomme (by Roger Coggio) - Le maître d'armes
1983: La vie est un roman (by Alain Resnais) - Georges Leroux
1984: The Razor's Edge (by John Byrum) - Albert
1987: Vent de panique (by Bernard Stora) - Machavert
1991: À demain (by Didier Martiny) - Tremineras
1993: The Young Indiana Jones Chronicles (episode Paris, September 1908) (by René Manzor) - Henri Rousseau (final appearance)

External links
 
 Entretien de 1975 avec Pierre Tchernia sur le site de l'INA

1916 births
1995 deaths
Sociétaires of the Comédie-Française
French male stage actors
French male film actors
French male television actors
French film directors
Male actors from Paris
20th-century French male actors